Godolphin (Arabic: جودولفين) is the Maktoum family's private Thoroughbred horseracing stable and was named in honour of the Godolphin Arabian, who came from the desert to become one of the three founding stallions of the modern Thoroughbred. Godolphin is buried at Wandlebury Park in Cambridge, where there is a stone to commemorate this horse in the passageway of the old buildings.

Godolphin's headquarters are in Dubai, United Arab Emirates. It operates two racing stables in Newmarket, UK, two in Sydney, Australia, one in Melbourne, Australia, and also has horses in training with independent trainers in Great Britain, Australia, France, Japan, United States, and Ireland. UAE Vice President, Prime Minister and Ruler of Dubai, Sheikh Mohammed bin Rashid Al Maktoum is the driving force behind Godolphin.

The family's breeding operation, Darley, is named in honour of another of the three original Thoroughbred stallions, Darley Arabian. Darley breeds horses in Australia, France, Ireland, Japan, United Kingdom, and United States. Dubai Millennium, who won the Dubai World Cup at Nad Al Sheba, UAE and the Prince Of Wales's Stakes at Royal Ascot, UK in 2000, stood at Dalham Hall.

Godolphin has won over 5,000 races worldwide and numerous awards since its inception in 1992, marking their 5,000th win in August 2018. Its most successful years numerically are 2015 (650 wins), 2017 (607 wins), 2016 (597 wins), and 2014 (361 wins).

Godolphin was leading owner at the Dubai World Cup Carnival on eleven successive years from 2008 to 2018, and crowned British Champion Owner on twelve occasions - 1996, 1998, 1999, 2001, 2004, 2006, 2007, 2012, 2013, 2015, 2016, and 2017. Saeed bin Suroor trained his 200th Dubai World Cup Carnival winner when the aptly-named Very Special won the G2 Cape Verdi on 26 January 2017.

Godolphin won an Eclipse Award for top North American owner at the 39th annual Eclipse Awards ceremony in 2010. It was the first time that Godolphin won the award for top North American owner. The stable has had winners in 14 countries (Australia, Canada, France, Germany, Hong Kong, Ireland, Italy, Japan, Qatar, Singapore, Turkey, UAE, United Kingdom, and United States). Godolphin would again win the award for top owner at the Eclipse Awards in both 2012 and 2020.

Activities

Godolphin's first runner and winner was Cutwater (GB) at Nad Al Sheba, Dubai on December 24, 1992 while Godolphin's international operation commenced in 1994.

Godolphin's operations are based in Al Quoz, Dubai, UAE and in Newmarket, United Kingdom, at Godolphin Stables (former Stanley House Stables, built in 1903 by Frederick Stanley, 16th Earl of Derby) and the historic Moulton Paddocks. Godolphin also has three stables in Australia, two in Sydney and one in Melbourne.

To date, Godolphin has won a total of 288 Group One races around the globe. Godolphin registered its 100th Group One win with Sulamani in the 2003 Arlington Million. Hunter's Light, trained by Saeed bin Suroor and ridden by Silvestre de Sousa, recorded Godolphin's 200th Group One success with an impressive victory in the Al Maktoum Challenge R3 Sponsored By Emirates Airline at Meydan, Dubai, on Saturday, March 9, 2013.

Godolphin has won the Group One Dubai World Cup on ten occasions, thanks to Almutawakel (1999), Dubai Millennium (2000), Street Cry (2002), Moon Ballad (2003), Electrocutionist (2006), Monterosso (2012), African Story (2014), Prince Bishop (2015) and Thunder Snow (2018 and 2019).

Numerous major North American wins include six at the Breeders’ Cup meeting, highlighted by the victories of Daylami (1999) and Fantastic Light (2001) in the Breeders’ Cup Turf and Outstrip (2013) in the Breeders' Cup Juvenile Turf, Wuheida in the Breeders' Cup Filly and Mare Turf (2017) and Talismanic in the Breeders' Cup Turf (2017).

In keeping with its pioneering international outlook, Godolphin has gained four wins at the Cathay Pacific Hong Kong International Races and Heart Lake scored an early Japanese Group One win in the 1995 Yasuda Kinen.

In 2013, stable jockey Frankie Dettori departed the organisation. In the same year, the British Horseracing Authority disclosed that Godolphin employee Mahmood Al Zarooni  (who had joined Godolphin as a trainer a few years earlier) had been charged with doping after 15 Godolphin horses he was training had tested positive for anabolic steroids. Sheikh Mohammed declared he was "appalled and angered" and would 'lock down' the stables with 'immediate effect'. Al Zarooni was quickly dismissed, and all 15 horses were later cleared to race. Godolphin commissioned an independent inquiry into Al Zarooni's activities, and subsequently a major reorganisation took place within Godolphin's UK operations On account of the scale of Godolphin's operations, and as doping activity is generally extremely rare in flat horse racing (robust anti-doping procedures mean detection is highly probable), the incident was described by The Economist as "the biggest doping scandal in racing history".

In late 2014, it was announced that Godolphin is to have a permanent presence in Australia. William Buick and James Doyle were appointed stable jockeys in early 2015, joining Mickael Barzalona, who joined the team in March 2012, and is Godolphin's retained rider in France.

In September 2016, Saeed bin Suroor reached a landmark 2,000 winners worldwide when Sky Hunter won the Listed Foundation Stakes at Goodwood, UK.

From Saturday, 17 March 2018, all horses currently racing in the JRA in the name of His Highness Sheikh Mohammed bin Rashid Al Maktoum, will race in the name of Godolphin. The racing silks carried in Japan will change to royal blue with a lighter blue band on the sleeve.

Personnel

 Godolphin has three principal retained trainers; Saeed bin Suroor (UK & UAE), Charlie Appleby (UK & UAE) and James Cummings (Australia), along with numerous horses in training with external independent trainers in Australia, Japan, France, Ireland, the United Kingdom and the United States of America.
 Godolphin has three principal retained jockeys; William Buick, James Doyle and Mickael Barzalona.

Horses
Some of Godolphin's top horses include:

 Adayar
 African Story
 Alizee
 Aljabr
 Almutawakel
 Anamoe
 Astern
 Bachir
 Balanchine
 Barney Roy
 Belardo
 Bivouac
 Blue Bunting
 Blue Point
 Campanologist
 Cape Cross
 Cape Verdi
 Cascadian
 Castle Lady
 Cavalryman
 Certify
 Cezanne
 Classic Cliche
 Cloth of Stars
 Colette
 Coroebus
 Creachadoir
 Creative Force
 Cross Counter
 Dawn Approach
 Daylami
 Diktat
 Discreet Cat
 Dubai Millennium
 Dubawi 
 Electrocutionist
 Encke
 Essential Quality
 Exosphere
 Fantastic Light
 Farhh
 Flit
 Fly to the Stars
 Frosted
 Ghaiyyath
 Grandera
 Halling
 Harry Angel
 Hartnell
 Hawkbill
 Hurricane Lane
 Ibn Khaldun
 In Secret
 Island Sands
 It's Tricky
 Jack Hobbs
 Kayf Tara
 Kazzia
 Kiamichi
 Lammtarra
 Lyre
 Lyric of Light
 Mamool
 Marienbard
 Mark of Esteem
 Masar
 Mastery
 Maxfield
 Medaaly
 Mezzo Soprano
 Modern Games
 Moon Ballad
 Moonshell
 Music Note
 Mutafaweq
 Nations Pride
 Native Trail
 Naval Crown
 Nedawi
 Night of Thunder
 Old Persian
 Outstrip
 Papineau
 Paulele
 Persian King
 Pinatubo
 Poet's Voice
 Prince Bishop
 Punctilious 
 Questing
 Quorto
 Ramonti
 Refuse To Bend
 Rewilding
 Ribchester
 Royal Marine
 Rule of Law
 Sakhee
 Savatiano
 Shamardal
 Space Blues
 Street Cry
 Sulamani
 Swain
 Talismanic
 Thunder Snow
 Trekking
 Victor Ludorum
 White Moonstone
 Wild Illusion
 Wuheida
 Yibir
 Zahrat Dubai

References

External links
Godolphin website
Article on Godolphin Stables 

Racing stables in the United Kingdom
Newmarket, Suffolk
British racehorse owners and breeders
Emirati racehorse owners and breeders
Equestrian sports in the United Arab Emirates
Eclipse Award winners
Owners of Prix de l'Arc de Triomphe winners
Doping cases in equestrian